The 1979 Talladega 500 was a NASCAR Winston Cup Series race that took place on August 5, 1979, at Alabama International Motor Speedway in Talladega, Alabama.

Background
Talladega Superspeedway, originally known as Alabama International Motor Superspeedway (AIMS), is a motorsports complex located north of Talladega, Alabama. It is located on the former Anniston Air Force Base in the small city of Lincoln. The track is a Tri-oval and was constructed by International Speedway Corporation, a business controlled by the France Family, in the 1960s. Talladega is most known for its steep banking and the unique location of the start/finish line - located just past the exit to pit road. The track currently hosts the NASCAR series such as the Sprint Cup Series, Xfinity Series, and the Camping World Truck Series.

Race report
There were 41 American-born drivers on the starting grid; 21 of them failed to finish the race. Most of the problems were engine failures. After 188 laps and five caution flags, Darrell Waltrip would defeat David Pearson by a minute and two seconds in front of a crowd of eighty thousand fans. After many lead changes, Waltrip lead the final 55 laps.

Kyle Petty would earn ninth place in his inaugural Winston Cup race after starting 18th. Bob Burcham and Al Holbert would make this race their individual swan songs. The total prize purse at this event was $205,680 ($ when adjusted for inflation). While the winner would collect $32,325 of this purse ($ when adjusted for inflation), the last-place finisher, Dick May, would collect $1,050 ($ when adjusted for inflation).

Oldsmobile would rack up their 100th victory in the history of the NASCAR Cup Series.

Qualifying

Finishing order
Section reference: 

 Darrell Waltrip
 David Pearson†
 Ricky Rudd
 Richard Petty
 Jody Ridley
 Tighe Scott
 Harry Gant
 Buddy Arrington
 Kyle Petty
 Richard Childress
 Dick Brooks†
 Bill Elliott
 Jimmy Means
 Bob Burcham†
 Rick Newsom†
 Bruce Hill*
 Steve Moore
 J.D. McDuffie†
 Grant Adcox†
 James Hylton†
 Benny Parsons*†
 Ronnie Thomas*
 Frank Warren
 Cale Yarborough*
 Joe Millikan*
 Baxter Price*
 D.K. Ulrich*
 Bobby Allison*
 Coo Coo Marlin*†
 Donnie Allison*
 Dave Marcis*
 Marty Robbins*†
 Terry Labonte*
 Neil Bonnett*†
 Jack Ingram*
 Tommy Gale*†
 Blackie Wangerin*
 Al Holbert*†
 Buddy Baker*†
 Cecil Gordon*†
 Dick May*†

† signifies that the driver is known to be deceased 
* Driver failed to finish race

Standings after the race

References

Talladega 500
Talladega 500
NASCAR races at Talladega Superspeedway